The Metro is a 2011 Malayalam action thriller film directed by Bipin Prabhakar starring R. Sarathkumar, Nivin Pauly, Bhavana, Suraj Venjaramoodu, Bhagath Manuel, Biyon Gemini, Arun and Suresh Krishna. It is a hyperlink film based on three separate incidents that take place in Kochi. The film is produced by Dileep under his Grand Productions.

Plot
The film is  based on three separate incidents that take place in Kochi. The first one involves the murder of a young politician, Jaimy Padamadan, which is being investigated by CI Jacob Alexander. The murder occurs during an election season, and the main suspect in the case is a local don named Paruthikkadan Shaji. The investigation is affected due to his political influences.

The second story is about Anupama, an I. T. Employee. She is being followed by a group of gangsters. The story takes new turns, and the mystery gets solved.

The third story is about a group of five friends, Harikrishnan, Usman, Sujathan, Sooraj and Gopan. Harikrishnan is a youth working in Gulf. He and his friends are travelling to Pala. He has a package from Gulf which he is supposed to give to another person. The story takes new turns during their journey.

They lands in trouble when Usman beats Shaji's brother Freddy for hitting their jeep and Gopan records a murder of Shaji killing his rival Thatill John as he recorded Jaimy's murder. Shaji and henchmen went for hunting them. But during the hunt, Freddy kills Sujathan with a knife and in revenge Hari kills Freddy. Then they called Anupama whom they saved once from a robbery created by Shaji's men for a help. She goes to Jacob who is her brother and then he plans to save them from Shaji. Shaji's men finds them again but during the chase Sooraj gets caught. Jacob arrives and manages the save them. Shaji uses Sooraj to lure his friends. He calls Hari and threatens them to come to the same place where Hari killed Freddy with the phone otherwise he will kill Sooraj. They comes to the place but when Shaji's men check their body for the phone they couldn't find it. It is revealed that they gave the phone to Jacob for checking the murder video and to call the fire Force and ambulance to wake up the villagers. Jacob fights with Shaji's henchmen and beats Shaji. When the villagers arrives, Jacob kills Shaji with his service revolver as the villagers tells that the goons like Shaji is no longer needed as he will bribe the Police and ministers.

Cast

 R. Sarathkumar as CI Jacob Alexander and Head Constable Alexander 
 Nivin Pauly as Harikrishnan
 Bhagath Manuel as Usman
 Suraj Venjaramoodu as Sujathan
 Biyon as Gopan
 Arun as Sooraj
 Bhavana as Anupama
 Suresh Krishna as Parathikkadan Shaji
 G. K. Pillai as Kumbalam Varkey (MP)
 Nishanth Sagar as Freddy
 Kalashala Babu as Louis
 Jagathy Sreekumar as Achayan
 Ponnamma Babu as Achayan's wife
 Sadiq as Vishwam
 Kalabhavan Shajohn as A worker of Kattappuram Automobiles
 Rajeev Parameshwar as Jaimy Padamadan
 Mahima
 Manju Satheesh as Sumathi, Sujathan's wife
 Baby Ester as Sujathan's daughter
 Deepika Mohan as Harikrishnan's mother
 Dileep as himself (Cameo) Narrator

Production
The Metro is the fourth directoral venture of Bipin Prabhakar, who previously directed Samasthakeralam PO, One Way Ticket and Khaki. The film's cast includes several new faces along with R. Sarathkumar, who does his first lead role in a Malayalam film. Nivin Pauly and Bhagath Manuel, who debuted through Malarvaadi Arts Club once again collaborate in this film. Sreeram handles the camera while Mahesh Narayanan is the editor. Major parts were filmed from Kochi.

Release
The film was later dubbed and released in Tamil as Thennindian during December 2015.

References

External links

2011 films
2010s Malayalam-language films
2011 action thriller films
Hyperlink films
Indian action thriller films
Fictional portrayals of the Kerala Police
Films shot in Kochi
Films scored by Shaan Rahman